The Seminole burning was the lynching by live burning of two Seminole youth, Lincoln McGeisey and Palmer Sampson, near Maud, Oklahoma, on January 8, 1898. 

On December 30, 1897, a woman named Mary Leard was murdered in her home by a Native American man. When her body was discovered by her husband and Maud townspeople the next day, a white mob began to form, and they combed the area to find the person guilty. They cornered, detained, kidnapped, tortured, and—in some cases—mock lynched several men over a few days, before they settled on two teenagers they thought were guilty of the crime: Lincoln McGeisey and Palmer Sampson. McGeisey and Sampson were chosen despite there being no evidence for a second killer, and the mob accused them of raping, murdering, and having sex with the dead body of Mary Leard. Although Sampson allegedly admitted guilt in the crime, both of them were likely innocent.

The mob chained the two together by the neck and brought them to a makeshift prayer site. They were surrounded by dry brush and wooden poles, and after a member of the mob lit the pile on fire, they burned alive. McGeisey's flesh sloughed off his body, and Sampson tried to struggle against the flames; both died. They were buried on Seminole land, their bodies still chained together.

Dozens of men were indicted in relation to the case. In front of judge John R. Thomas, special prosecutor Horace Speed led the prosecutions of the men involved in the lynching. Ultimately, six of them were convicted and imprisoned. It was the first successful prosecution of lynching in the Southwestern United States, though one man was released early from prison and returned home to a celebration proclaiming his innocence.

Background

Political background
Throughout the nineteenth century, the American government removed the Seminole people from Florida to the Indian Territory, a region that now lies in the eastern part of Oklahoma. The Five Civilized Tribes (including the Seminole) underwent the Reconstruction Treaties, which divided their land claims in the western and central parts of Oklahoma and opened it to settlement from other tribes. The Seminole people underwent social changes during this time of removal and resettlement, and transitioned into a mostly pastoralist lifestyle. In 1889, parts of this ceded land were opened to settlement by whites, and in 1890, it became organized as the Oklahoma Territory. On the Oklahoma side of its boundary with the Indian Territory sat Maud in Pottawatomie County.

In 1896, the Oklahoma and Indian Territories had at least ten lynchings altogether. In territorial history, most of those murdered in bouts of extrajudicial mob violence were black or Native Americans: For black people accused of crimes, they were frequently lynched; for Native Americans accused, they were sometimes lynched, depending on the accusation; and for white people accused, they were only infrequently lynched. In one case in Pottawatomie County in 1897, a mob attempted to lynch a man named Israel C. McGlothlin: He was hanged alive three times, but he ultimately survived.

Murder
On the evening of December 30, 1897, Mary Leard (also rendered as Mary Laird or Julia Laird) was at her home alone with her three children as her husband stayed at a friend's house. A Native American man with a distinctive scar on his cheek approached the house and left, only to return later that night. He chased Leard out of the house and tried to shoot her twice, but the gun failed. He murdered her by hitting her over the head with his gun, threw her infant daughter Cora on the floor, asked the children for money, and then fled.

Mary Leard's children left her dead body outside, and it was partially eaten by roaming pigs during the night. The next morning, the Leard children sought help, and Maud townspeople and their father returned to find her dead. Cora died from her injuries a few months later.

Victims

Lincoln McGeisey was the 18-year-old son of Seney and Thomas McGeisey. Thomas was a Seminole farmer, landowner, and public official who served as the superintendent of the Seminole Nation's public schools, and he was selected to visit Washington, D.C., in early 1898 in a Seminole delegation. He owned the land on which the Leards built their home. McGeisey had four siblings through his father: Martha, Nora, William, and James.

Palmer Sampson was the uneducated 17-year-old son of Sukey Natuksie and Sampson Walker; he had a sister named Rhoda. He was involved in crime, having earlier pleaded guilty to horse theft (whether he was sentenced for this crime is unknown), and he had only recently returned from the Kansas State Penitentiary for larceny. He could not understand or speak English.

Mob 

After finding Leard's dead body, her husband and his friends looked for a man that met the description of the murderer: a Native American man with a distinctive cheek scar.

Though close acquaintances of the Leard family initially congregated and planned out their violence, this tight inner circle soon expanded, and many of its members were strangers to the Leards; they had no personal stake in the crime, and many traveled a great distance for the express purpose of lynching. The mob distorted the truth of the underlying crime: in their imagination, two men raped Leard, murdered her, assaulted Cora, left the scene, and then returned to have sex with Leard's corpse. Most members of the final mob did not understand the circumstances of the murder, including the fact that Leard had not been raped.

Violence 
The mob combed through the area and arrested men who did not fit the physical description of Leard's murderer. On January 1, 1898, they arrested, tortured, and held in bondage a 19-year-old man named Billy (whose last name was either Harjo or Thlocco), attempting to extract a confession from him, but Leard's son never said he looked like his mother's killer. They arrested Thlocco again and threatened to murder him; he was released. Two other men, never identified by Leard's son as the killer, were also chained up and released. Around this time, they shot at a group of several Native American men; the men were not struck and were never arrested.

They arrested Lincoln McGeisey twice, but Leard's son testified that he did not kill Leard. They interrogated him—asking where he was on the night of the murder, to which he responded he was with family—stripped him down, and continued asking whether he murdered Leard. They strung a noose around his neck and threatened to immediately lynch him if he did not confess, but he continued to deny, so they attacked him, strung a noose around his neck again, and brought him back to the home.

They continued combing through the area in an attempt to find the killer, arresting and threatening several men. They invaded the home of John Washington, kidnapped him at gunpoint, and mock lynched him by stringing a noose around his neck and hanging him from a tree until he lost consciousness, then brought him down and brutalized him.

The mob intended to lynch Washington and McGeisey, even though Leard's husband thought McGeisey was innocent of the crime. They decided to release Washington in exchange for Palmer Sampson, a boy who also did not meet the description of the killer. McGeisey and Sampson were chained together at the neck while held in custody. Sampson allegedly admitted to the murder through a translator, even though neither Sampson nor McGeisey are likely to have committed the crime. On January 7, the plans to lynch Sampson and McGeisey were finalized with 64 accomplices present.

Lynching 

In the still-dark morning hours of January 8, 1898, a mob carried McGeisey and Sampson to a makeshift prayer site filled with dry brush, just south of the post office in Maud—a "tabernacle" in the local parlance. Leard had previously confessed her sins to the community at this location, and the mob wanted to "mingle their [McGeisey's and Sampson's] blood with her departed spirit". 

They were shackled together by their necks to opposite sides of a tree, facing northwards, as the mob surrounded them with dry wooden poles from the site's brush arbor. According to a news account, their clothes were doused in oil. The mob offered the two a chance to pray; only McGeisey did, in his own language. One of the members of the mob, which consisted of more than two hundred people, then lit the wood on fire. Both McGeisey and Sampson were burned alive. McGeisey's muscle and skin dripped and slid off the right side of his body as he was burned. Unlike Sampson—who struggled against the heat and kicked pieces of burning wood away from his body—McGeisey did not wrangle his body away from the flames. A member of the mob took one of their bodies and impaled a skull with a stick, causing the still-boiling brains to be released. 

According to a newspaper report, their arms and legs burned away, leaving behind only unrecognizable "trunks" joined by padlocked chains. Still chained together, they were eventually recovered and buried on Seminole land.

Immediate aftermath 

The white public of Oklahoma Territory largely supported those who lynched McGeisey and Sampson. Soon after the men were murdered, newspapers started claiming that members of the Seminole Nation were planning to target white Oklahomans in a race riot. Writers for the Weekly Oklahoma State Capital claimed on January 15, 1898—through a special bulletin—that in response to "the excesses of the armed bands of whites", Native American revenge was "imminent". This was a falsehood crafted by a communications employee in Earlsboro, Oklahoma, and officials from the Department of the Interior were unable to find any evidence of any insurrection.

Investigation and arrests 

In January 1898, the federal government began investigating the lynching as a criminal conspiracy, but could not investigate it as murder because there was no applicable federal murder statute. There were complications in the investigation, however, as many witnesses, both white and Seminole, were reluctant to provide testimony, many of the Seminole witnesses did not speak English, and at least one witness was intimidated by a mob and forced to destroy his deposition. 

Independently, Governor Cassius McDonald Barnes of the Oklahoma Territory offered a $1,000 reward for anyone who could secure a conviction against mob members for their role in "acts of lawlessness and barbarism". In February and March, several warrants were executed by federal investigators, but it remained difficult to find all of the members of the mob; out of around 90 people who were due to be arrested, only 67 had been located.

Indictments and trials 
Horace Speed was appointed as a special prosecutor in April 1898. He successfully persuaded a grand jury to return indictments against dozens of men—45 on charges of kidnapping, and 49 on charges of arson—though many of them successfully evaded capture for a time, and some found comfort in the territory of the Chickasaw Nation.

Before Judge John R. Thomas, Speed successfully prosecuted several men, some of whom requested a jury trial and some pleaded guilty. In total, six members of the mob were sentenced to prison: Nelson Jones (21 years), Andrew J. Mathis (10 years), Mont Ballard (7 years), Sam Pryor (3 years), Bird Ivanhoe (3 years), and H. Clay Roper (3 years). It was the first successful prosecution of lynching in the Southwestern United States. Though Mont Ballard was sentenced to 10 years, he only served 7, and he returned home to a celebration of hundreds in Maud who proclaimed his innocence.

Compensation 
On July 1, 1898, after McGeisey and Sampson were exonerated of the murder, the United States Congress appropriated over $35,000 ($ in ) in relation to the lynching. $5,000 was allotted to each family of the victims, $25,000 for the prosecution of the lynchers, and $82.50 to Sampson's family and $1,113.25 to McGeisey's for property damage. The legislation was written by Senator Matthew Quay of Pennsylvania.

Cultural legacy 
One of the participants in the tortures and lynching—James Edwards Nix—wrote a memoir for his family in 1942, recounting his participation and suggesting that alcohol was the reason the murder and the lynching occurred. His great-grandchild, Kirsten Dyck, wrote in 2016 that the lynching was an instance of the ongoing genocide of indigenous peoples in the United States, and that the lynching was tantamount to a fractal massacre: individual "atrocities over large geographical areas" that contribute to genocide.

According to race historian Murray R. Wickett, the lynching is "instructive" because it demonstrates two elements of race relations in the United States at the time: That white mobs lynched both Native Americans and African Americans accused of rape, and that the federal government cared more for lynched Native American people than for lynched black people. Wickett wrote that if McGeisey and Sampson were black, instead of Seminole, they "likely" would have been murdered "without repercussions".

In 1996,  released Seminole Burning, an examination of the lynching. Historian Michael J. Pfeifer called it a "magisterial [...] case study" which "richly mined" the historical evidence of the lynching and its aftermath, and said Brundage's typology of lynch mobs was a "clear[] influence" on Littlefield's writing. He called for more examinations of the lynching of Native Americans, since there is extensive documentary evidence of their existence, and it is underrepresented in historical analyses.

Notes

References

Citations

Scholarship

Newspapers

References

Scholarship

Newspapers

Further reading 
1898 in Indian Territory
1898 in Oklahoma Territory
Lynching deaths in Oklahoma
Lynching in the United States
Native American genocide
Seminole Nation of Oklahoma